Betkuchi is the locality in Guwahati, Assam, India; surrounded by the localities of Jyotikuchi, Lokhra and Garchuk.

See also
Bhangagarh
Jyotikuchi

References

Neighbourhoods in Guwahati